Joseph Pierre Dumas (1875 – January 14, 1950) was a politician in Manitoba, Canada.  He served in the Legislative Assembly of Manitoba from 1915 to 1920 as a member of the Liberal Party.

Born in Neche, North Dakota, Dumas came to Manitoba in 1897. He worked as a construction contractor. In 1898, he married Mary Nisbett.

Dumas was elected to the Manitoba legislature in the 1915 provincial election, defeating a Conservative and an independent Liberal candidate in the constituency of St. Boniface.  The Liberal Party won this election, and Dumas served as a backbench supporter of Tobias Norris's administration for the next five years.

He ran for re-election in the 1920 campaign, but finished third against Conservative-Independent candidate Joseph Bernier.

In 1935, Dumas moved to California. He died in Saugus, California.

References 

1875 births
1950 deaths
Franco-Manitoban people
Manitoba Liberal Party MLAs
People from Pembina County, North Dakota
People from Saugus, Santa Clarita, California
Métis politicians